Adolfo de Carolis (1874–1928) was an Italian painter, xylographer, illustrator and photographer. He is generally associated with Art Nouveau (known as "Stile Liberty" in Italy), although many of his works could also be classified as Symbolism.

Biography 

His father was a doctor. In 1888, after his primary schooling in Ripatransone, he was sent to study at the Accademia di Belle Arti di Bologna. Upon graduating in 1892, he went to Rome on a scholarship to attend the decorative painting classes at the "Museo Artistico Industriale". His first professional work, done together with his teacher, involved restoration of the Borgia Apartments in the Apostolic Palace. While in Rome, he befriended the painter, Nino Costa and, in 1896, helped him found "In arte libertas", a society opposed to the official styles promoted by the academies and critics. He was the grandfather of Francis Losavio-Ordaz, a prominent professor in computer Science at the Venezuelan University Simón Bolívar. Francis passed away in France on September 10, 2020, at the age of 76.

In 1899, he was invited to participate in the third exposition held by the Venice Biennale. The following year, he received a commission from Count Forcioli-Conti to design a bronze tabernacle for the baptismal font at Ajaccio Cathedral, where Napoleon was baptized. In 1901, he was named an "Academician of Merit" at the Accademia di Belle Arti di Perugia.

That same year, he was awarded a chair at the Accademia di Belle Arti di Firenze. In 1902, he married one of his models, Quintilina Ciucci. For a time after that, he concentrated on creating illustrations for various artistic and literary  publications. He also produced woodcuts and other types of illustrations for books by Giosuè Carducci, Giovanni Pascoli and, especially, Gabriele D'Annunzio, with whom he formed a lifelong partnership. In his later years, he would design bank notes, posters, calendars, postcards, advertisements and even product labels. He also wrote essays on art and took numerous students.

Major works

In 1905, together with Galileo Chini and others, he organized the first "Esposizione dell’Arte Toscana". From 1907 to 1908, he decorated the Ballroom of the Palazzo del Governo in Ascoli Piceno, without compensation, to say thanks for the scholarship that had enabled him to come to Rome. At this time, he also designed bookplates for several famous personalities, such as Eleanora Duse. In 1909, he was appointed Knight of the Order of the Crown of Italy. Two years later, he began one of his largest projects, decorating the Palazzo del Podestà in Bologna. He would work on it intermittently until his death.

In 1915, he was appointed to a chair at the Accademia di Belle Arti di Brera, but left to live in Bologna two years later. After the First World War, he went to Rome, where he designed medals and certificates for the Ministry of War. He also sat on several committees dedicated to creating monuments for the fallen in the cities of Osimo and Cortona and choosing sculptors for the Altare della Patria.

In 1922, he became a teacher at the Accademia di Belle Arti di Roma. At the same time, he worked on frescoes for the Consiglio Provinciale in Arezzo (completed in 1924), followed by the Capella di San Francesco at the Basilica of Saint Anthony of Padua, the Palazzetto Veneto in Ravenna and the Villa Puccini at Torre del Lago.

For several years, he suffered from cancer. After a brief stay in Paris, where he sought treatment at the Pasteur Institute, he returned to Rome and died there, aged fifty-four, and was buried at the Cimitero del Verano. In 1950, his remains were transferred to a church in Montefiore dell'Aso.

References

Further reading 
 Simonetta Di Pino Giambi, Adolfo de Carolis. Il piacere dell'arte, Pitti Arte e Libri,  1992 
 Rossana Bossaglia (ed.), Adolfo de Carolis e il Liberty nelle Marche (exhibition catalog), Macerata, Mazzotta, 1999.
 Cristiano Marchegiani (ed.), Il Mare Piceno. Scritti letterari ed estetici, writings by De Carolis, Il Lavoro Editoriale, 1999 
 Silvia Zanini, Adolfo De Carolis e la xilografia. Uno studio sulla decorazione del libro tra Otto e Novecento, Giroal, 2003.
 Tiziana Maffei (ed.), Adolfo De Carolis e la democrazia del bello (exhibition catalog), Polo Museo de San Francesco in  Montefiore dell'Aso, Edizione Librati, 2009.

External links 

 ArtNet: More works by De Carolis.
 Museo Adolfo De Carolis @ the Montefiore dell'Aso website.

1874 births
1928 deaths
People from the Province of Ascoli Piceno
Italian illustrators
19th-century Italian painters
Italian male painters
20th-century Italian painters
20th-century Italian male artists
Italian graphic designers
Photographers from Rome
Italian poster artists
Italian decorators
Deaths from cancer in Lazio
19th-century Italian male artists